Christianity in Japan is among the nation's minority religions in terms of individuals who state an explicit affiliation or faith. Between less than 1 percent and 1.5% of the population claims Christian belief or affiliation. Although formally banned in 1612 and today critically portrayed as a foreign "religion of colonialism", Christianity has played a role in the shaping of the relationship between religion and the Japanese state for more than four centuries. Most large Christian denominations, including Roman Catholicism, Protestantism, Oriental Orthodoxy, and Orthodox Christianity, are represented in Japan today.

Christian culture has a generally positive image in Japan. The majority of Japanese people are, traditionally, of the Shinto or Buddhist faith. The majority of Japanese couples, about  60–70%, are wed in 'nonreligious' Christian ceremonies. This makes Christian weddings the most influential aspect of Christianity in contemporary Japan.

Etymology 

History

Missionaries and early expansion

The first appearance of Christianity in Japan was the arrival of the Portuguese Catholics in 1549. Navarrese missionary Francis Xavier arrived in Japan with three Japanese Catholic converts intending to start a church in Japan. The local Japanese people initially assumed that the foreigners were from India and that Christianity was a new "Indian faith". These mistaken impressions were due to already existing ties between the Portuguese and India; the Indian state of Goa was a central base for Portuguese India at the time, and a significant portion of the crew on board their ships were Indian Christians.

Later on, the Roman Catholic missionary activities were exclusively performed by Jesuits and mendicant orders, such as the Franciscans and Dominicans. Francis Xavier (who would later be canonized a Catholic saint for his missionary work), Cosme de Torres (a Jesuit priest), and Juan Fernández were the first who arrived in Kagoshima hoping to bring Christianity to Japan. Xavier and the Jesuit order were held in good esteem, and his efforts seem to have been rewarded with a thriving community of converts. At baptism, these converts were given Portuguese "Christian names" and encouraged to adopt Western cultural habits. This practice contributed to suspicions that the converts were in reality foreign agents working to subvert the local social order.

The earliest success Christianity witnessed in Japan occurred in Kyushu. Conversions of local warlords like Ōmura Sumitada, Arima Yoshisada, and Ōtomo Sōrin led to the conversion of many of their subjects. The conversion of several elites in the area was likely due to the decentralized nature of the Sengoku period where warlords vied for control among themselves. This power vacuum led some warlords to believe that being more open to external sources of power and legitimacy as a possible method to gain an advantage. As several daimyos and their subjects converted to Christianity, the destruction of Buddhist and Shinto temples and shrines would often accompany it, with the Jesuits also contributing to the destruction and persecutions. Buddhist monks and Shinto priests would face persecution by being forcefully evicted out of their religious sites, be forced to marry, or pressured to convert.

Perceived threat to Japan 

Under Oda Nobunaga, the Jesuits enjoyed the favor of his regency.  The successor of Oda, Toyotomi Hideyoshi at first protected Christianity, however later changed his policy with the publishing of the Bateren Edict,  banning missionary activities.  After conquering Kyushu, Hideyoshi visited Hakozaki and came to believe that Jesuits were selling Japanese people as slaves overseas, Christians were destroying shrines and temples, and people were being forced to convert to Christianity, resulting in the aforementioned edict. Alessandro Valignano, on 14 December 1582 wrote a letter to Governor-General of the Philippines Francisco de Sande Picón stating that it would be impossible to conquer Japan by military power and converting Japan to Christianity was the most important task of church. Scholars also theorise that Hideyoshi believed the true mission of the Christian missionaries was to convert the Japanese population to Christianity, overthrow the government, and turn it into a colony.

In 1637, Matsukura Katsuie misgoverned his territory and imposed a high tax onto people and oppressed Christians. This, combined with famine, led to the Shimabara Rebellion. First it was a peasant movement, but later Christians joined the rebellion, resulting in Ieyasu's ban on Christianity.  This was the largest rebellion in the history of Japan and convinced the Shogunate that Christianity was a threat to them, causing them to isolate Japan from the outside world for almost 250 years.

Persecution under the Shogunate

Under Hideyoshi and the succeeding Tokugawa shogunate, Catholic Christianity was repressed and adherents were persecuted. During Toyotomi rule especially, foreign missionaries were killed in Japan, some by (Japanese-style) crucifixion; most famously, the twenty-six martyrs of Japan were tortured and crucified on crosses outside Nagasaki to discourage Christianity in 1597. (Hideyoshi nonetheless showed favor to daimyō who had converted, such as Konishi Yukinaga.) Following a brief respite as Tokugawa Ieyasu rose to power and pursued trade with the Portuguese powers, there were further persecutions and martyrdoms in 1613, 1630, 1632 and 1634.

The Tokugawa shoguns eradicated Christianity in Japan via murder, persecution and decrees. In 1638, an estimated 37,000 people (mostly Christians), were massacred after the Christian-led Shimabara Rebellion. In 50 years, the crackdown policies of the shoguns reduced the amount of Christians to near zero.

By this point, after the Shimabara Rebellion, the remaining Christians had been forced to publicly renounce their faith. These secret believers would often conceal Christian iconography in closed shrines, lanterns or inconspicuous parts of buildings. For example, Himeji Castle has a Christian cross on one of its 17th-century roof tiles, in place of a mon, indicating that one of its occupants was a secret Christian.

Drawn from the oral histories of Japanese Catholic communities, Shūsaku Endō's historical novel Silence provides detailed fictionalised accounts of the persecution of Christian communities and the suppression of the Church.

Opening of Japan

Captain Herbert Clifford was an officer in the Royal Navy during the Napoleonic Wars and the founder of the Loochoo Naval Mission (1843). Clifford worked with missionary the Rev. Bernard Jean Bettelheim, who was the first Christian missionary to Okinawa.

After Japan was opened to greater foreign interaction in 1853, many Christian clergymen were sent from Catholic, Protestant, and Orthodox churches, though proselytism was still banned. After the Meiji Restoration, freedom of religion was introduced in 1871, giving all Christian communities the right to legal existence and preaching.

Culture
Japan remains one of the most secular nations in the world according to the World Values Survey. While, as of 2007, there may be up to 3 million Japanese Christians, Christianity in Japan is spread among many denominational affiliations. 70 percent of Japanese churches have an average attendance of less than 50, though membership is often almost double this figure.

Holidays

The celebration of selected Christian holidays has gained popularity in Japan since the Second World War – primarily as commercial events, but with also an emphasis on sharing time with loved ones, either significant others or close family.

Except in Japan's minority Christian communities, Easter is not typically marked by any special form of celebration.

Christmas in Japan is celebrated on a much larger scale as a commercial and secular festival, but again is not an official public holiday. Christmas lights, Santa Claus, parties, gift exchanges, and eating Western-inspired Christmas foods, especially Kentucky Fried Chicken and strawberry shortcake, are all familiar features of this event. Many Christians have criticized this as a commercialization of the holiday, being contrary to the teachings of Jesus Christ. In Japan rather than being a family or religious occasion, Christmas is seen as a time to spend with friends or a significant other. Christmas Eve is celebrated as a couple's holiday on which romantic gifts are exchanged.

St. Valentine's Day in Japan is also celebrated, but the normal Western cultural traditions are often reversed – women give men a gift of chocolate, and on White Day, one month later, the favor is returned. Gifts are not exclusive to romantic relationships; women exchange gifts most frequently between one another and will occasionally give male co-workers chocolate, although this latter exchange is often referred to as an obligation gift. It is not as common for couples to go out on dates together; that element seems to be reflected in Christmas Eve instead.

Expression

Christian weddings have become prominent as an alternative (or addition) to traditional Shinto ceremonies. This is partially due to the successful missionary efforts of Japanese Christian churches and commercial endeavors. Architecturally resembling churches, wedding chapels have sprung up across Japan to meet the needs of Japanese who do not join Christian churches but still desire the ceremony.

Major denominations

Catholicism

Catholicism in Japan operates in communion with the worldwide Roman Catholic Church under the authority of the Pope in Rome. In 2005, there were approximately 509,000 Catholics in 16 dioceses in Japan. The patron saints of Japan are Francis Xavier and Peter Baptist.

When Francis Xavier arrived in Japan in 1549 as the first Catholic missionary to the archipelago, Catholicism was Japan's first contact with organized Christianity. The Roman Catholic Church remained the only major source of Christianization in Japan until the fall of the shogunate in 1867 and the Meiji restoration of 1868. The Society of Jesus started the initial missions, joined later on by the less cautious Franciscan order. Twenty Catholic missionaries operated in Japan by 1570. Nagasaki became the center of Japanese Catholicism, and maintained close cultural and religious ties to its Portuguese origins. These ties were severed once Christianity was outlawed in the early-17th century; at this point, Catholicism went underground, its rites preserved by the Kakure Kirishitan, or "hidden Christians", who continued practicing their faith in secret private devotion.

The samurai Hasekura Tsunenaga led a diplomatic mission, accompanied by over one hundred Japanese Christians and twenty-two samurai, to see Pope Paul V. Hasekura arrived in Acapulco, Mexico (then New Spain) in 1614; and would then travel to Spain. After meeting with King Philip III, Hasekura was baptized as a Roman Catholic under the name Felipe Francisco de Fachicura. After traveling to France and Rome, Hasekura returned to Japan in 1620 and was forced to renounce his adopted religion after Christianity was banned.

A multitude of Japanese Catholics were brutally tortured and killed for their faith, thus becoming martyrs. Many of these martyrs have been canonized, and their liturgical memorial is celebrated each year on February 6 in honor of their fidelity to "Christ and his Church" unto death.

In 1981 Pope John Paul II paid a visit to Japan, during which he met with Japanese people, the clergy, and Catholic lay-people, held Holy Mass in the Korakuen Stadium (Tokyo), and visited the Peace Memorial Park in Hiroshima, the Hill of Martyrs in Nagasaki, town of the Immaculate founded by St. Maximilian Kolbe in Nagasaki, and other places. Pope Francis also visited Japan in 2019.

Eastern Orthodoxy

Eastern Orthodoxy is a minor religion in Japan. The current primate of Japan is Daniel Nushiro, Metropolitan of all Japan and Archbishop of Tokyo, who was elevated to the primacy in 2000. The primate's seat is the Holy Resurrection Cathedral in Chiyoda, Tokyo. Founded in 1891, the cathedral has been known as Nikolai-do in honor of its founder Nicholas Kasatkin. The cathedral serves as the seat of the national primate of Japan and continues to be the main center of Orthodox Christian worship in Japan.

Eastern Orthodoxy was brought to Japan in the 19th century by St. Nicholas (baptized as Ivan Dmitrievich Kasatkin), who was sent in 1861 by the Russian Orthodox Church to Hakodate, Hokkaidō as priest to a chapel of the Russian Consulate. St. Nicholas of Japan made his own translation of the New Testament and some other religious books (Lenten Triodion, Pentecostarion, Feast Services, Book of Psalms, Irmologion) into Japanese. The Patriarchate of Moscow glorified, (canonized as a saint) Nicholas in 1970; he is now recognized as St. Nicholas, Equal-to-the-Apostles. His commemoration day is February 16. Andronic Nikolsky, appointed the first Bishop of Kyoto and later martyred as the archbishop of Perm during the Russian Revolution, was also canonized by the Russian Orthodox Church as a Saint and Martyr in the year 2000.

The Ecumenical Patriarchate is also present with the Greek Orthodox Exarchate of Japan under the Orthodox Metropolis of Korea.

Protestantism

James Curtis Hepburn, M.D., LL.D. (March 13, 1815 – June 11, 1911) was the first Presbyterian missionary to Japan, arriving in 1859, the same year as the first ordained representatives of the Anglican Communion, the Rev., later Bishop, Channing Moore Williams, founder of Rikkyo University, Tokyo, and the Rev. John Liggins of the Episcopal Church in the United States of America.

Hepburn went to Japan initially as a medical missionary with the American Presbyterian Mission opening a clinic in Kanagawa Prefecture, near present-day Tokyo. He later founded the Hepburn School, which developed into Meiji Gakuin University, and wrote a Japanese–English dictionary. In the dictionary's third edition, published in 1886, Hepburn adopted a new system for romanization of the Japanese language (Rōmajikai). This system is widely known as Hepburn romanization because Hepburn's dictionary popularized it. Hepburn also contributed to the Protestant translation of the Bible into Japanese. Hepburn returned to the United States in 1892. On March 14, 1905, Hepburn's 90th birthday, he was awarded the decoration of the Order of the Rising Sun, third class. Hepburn was the second foreigner to receive this honor.

Divie Bethune McCartee was the first ordained Presbyterian minister missionary to visit Japan, in 1861–1862. His gospel tract translated into Japanese was among the first Protestant literature in Japan. In 1865 McCartee moved back to Ningbo, China, but others have followed in his footsteps. There was a burst of growth of Christianity in the late 19th century when Japan reopened its doors to the West. Protestant church growth slowed dramatically in the early 20th century under the influence of the military government during the Shōwa period.

The post-World War II years have seen increasing activity by evangelicals, initially with North American influence, and some growth occurred between 1945 and 1960. The Japanese Bible Society was established in 1937 with the help of National Bible Society of Scotland (NBSS, now called the Scottish Bible Society), the American Bible Society, the British and Foreign Bible Society.

Other Christian

Jehovah's Witnesses 

In 2020, the number of Jehovah's Witnesses was 212,683 active publishers, united in 2,964 congregations; 273,856 people attended annual celebration of Lord's Evening Meal in 2020. Before 1945 they were banned in Japan. Many Jehovah's Witnesses were jailed; one of them, Katsuo Miura, was in the Hiroshima prison during the atomic bombing of Hiroshima.

Church of Jesus Christ of Latter-day Saints

As of year-end 2009, The Church of Jesus Christ of Latter-day Saints (LDS Church) reported 29 stakes, 14 districts, 163 wards, 125 branches, 7 missions, and 3 temples in Japan. As of July 2016, there are 128,216 members. The LDS Church was established in Japan in 1901 when the first LDS Church missionaries arrived on August 12, 1901. Among them was Heber J. Grant, at the time a member of the Quorum of the Twelve, the 7th President of the Church.

As of March 15, 2011 there were over 630 LDS missionaries serving in the church's six missions in Japan.

Art and media
Christian art in Japan dates back to the 16th century, with traditional shrines and Japanese artwork depicting the Christian faith within Japan. When Christianity was illegal in Japan, the local Christians developed distinctive forms of Christian art, literature, and cultural practices.

Christian media is prevalent within the popular culture of Japan, despite its relatively small Christian population. Superbook was a mainstream anime during the 1980s, and it remains a popular Christian media franchise worldwide. Because of this Christianity remains a popular topic in manga and anime, including Trigun and Saint Young Men. Gospel and contemporary Christian music are part of popular music in the country, the largest Christian music festival in the country is the Sunza Rock Festival, which is where many of Japan's CCM artists and bands perform.

International Christian University is the alma mater of several Japanese media professionals, including Kaz Hirai the former chairman of Sony. Sony owns several Christian media studios and outlets, including the Pure Flix streaming service.

See also

Religion in Japan

Notes

References

External links